FK Cementarnica 55 is a football club from Skopje, North Macedonia. They were recently competed in the Macedonian Third League (North Division).

History
The club was founded as FK FCU after the name of founder, ex cement factory 'FC Usje' (fabrika za cement Usje) Skopje.

Honours

Macedonian Second League:
Runners-up (1): 2006–07

Macedonian Football Cup:
Winners (1): 2002–03
Runners-up (1): 2001–02

Recent seasons

1Cementarnica 55 was excluded from the third league after not appearing at 3 matches.

Cementarnica in Europe
 Q = qualifier
 R1 = first round / R2 = second round

Historical list of coaches

 Alekso Mackov (1999 - 2000)
 Zoran Stratev (2000 - 2003)
 Žanko Savov (2003 - 2004)
 Zoran Stratev (2004 - 2005)
 Žanko Savov (Jun 2005 - 1 Nov 2005)
 Zoran Rosić (1 Nov 2005 - 1 Apr 2006)
 Borce Hristov (1 Apr 2006 - )
 Dragi Stefanovski (Jun 2007 -)
 Saše Reatovski

References

External links
  
 Club info at MacedonianFootball 
 Cementarnica lives in the heart of a Polish fan 
 Football Federation of Macedonia 

 
Cementarnica
Association football clubs established in 1955
1955 establishments in the Socialist Republic of Macedonia